Prince Louis Jean Marie de La Trémoïlle (8 February 1910 – 9 December 1933) was a French aristocrat. He was the 11th Duke of Thouars, 10th Duke of La Trémoïlle, 13th prince de Tarente, 17th prince de Talmond and 17th Count of Laval

Biography
The son of Louis Charles, 10th duc de Thouars and his wife, Hélene Pillet-Will (heiress of Count Frédéric Pillet-Will, the Parisian banker who  bought the Château Margaux wine label in 1879), La Trémoïlle was a member of the 1er régiment de chasseurs d'Afrique, a French army regiment.

He was killed in a fire at the estate of Leander J. McCormick  in Whitchurch, Hampshire, England, at the age of 23. Some noted at the time that his mysterious death by fire in England evoked the martyrdom at English hands of Joan of Arc five centuries earlier, who had been betrayed by the young duke's ancestor, Georges de la Trémoille, founder of the fortune of the House of La Trémoïlle. He died unmarried and left no known descendants.

Heritage
Although the 1944 Almanach de Gotha states that his successor as 14th duchesse de Thouars was the eldest of his four sisters, Princess Charlotte (1892–1971), the Genealogisches Handbuch des Adels of 1991 refrains from doing so, a 1959 ruling of the French courts having found that hereditary titles may only be transmitted "male-to-male" in "modern law". (The original grant of the dukedom, in July 1563 by Charles IX, stipulated that it was heritable by both male and female successors, although when erected into a pairie by King Henri le Grand in 1599, the letters patent restricted succession to the peerage — but not the dukedom — to male heirs).

The duke's nephew, Jean Charles Lamoral, as the only son of his eldest sister, had de La Trémoille appended to his own princely surname in the Kingdom of Belgium as "Prince de Ligne de La Trémoille" on 20 December 1934. The latter's only son, Jean Charles, bears the same title and name.

References

}

1910 births
1933 deaths
Louis Jean Marie
Dukes of Thouars
Louis Jean Marie
Deaths from fire
Accidental deaths in England